The Polish Coalition (KP) is a political alliance in Poland. It is led by the Polish People's Party.

It was formed in 2019. In the 2019 parliamentary election, the Polish Coalition placed fourth, winning 30 seats in total. Its 2020 presidential candidate was Władysław Kosiniak-Kamysz, who placed fifth in the first round. The coalition adheres to principles of Christian democracy, conservatism, and agrarianism. It has been described as centrist and centre-right.

History

Formation and parliamentary election 
The coalition was first mentioned on 4 February 2019, at an press conference as a union of the Polish People's Party (PSL), the Union of European Democrats (UED) and Modern (N). The idea was supported by former mayor of Wrocław, Rafał Dutkiewicz. In the May 2019 European Parliament election, the PSL, Modern and UED participated in the European Coalition, which included centre-right, centrist and centre-left parties.

The PSL general council decided to build the Polish Coalition, a centre-right coalition, on 1 June of that year. The desire for a coalition was first declared by the League of Polish Families (LPR) and the UED. The PSL also held talks with Kukiz'15, the Right Wing of the Republic and the Nonpartisan Local Government Activists movement, and invited Civic Platform (PO).

The PSL-UED parliamentary coalition changed its name to PSL-Polish Coalition on 4 July 2019, and was joined by former members of PO (Marek Biernacki and Jacek Tomczak) and Modern (Radosław Lubczyk). Two days later, the PSL general council announced that an alliance with PO is a coalition priority. Władysław Kosiniak-Kamysz confirmed UED cooperation.

On 23 July, the PSL's Piotr Zgorzelski confirmed that the Alliance of Democrats and Labour Party were part of the coalition and talks with Kukiz'15 and Nonpartisan Local Governments Association were cordial and would end soon. A week later, Marek Sawicki confirmed that the Association of Catholic Families had joined the coalition.

The Silesians Together party and the Jura-Silesian Association European Home joined the coalition on 5 August 2019. Three days later (after losing several MPs), Kukiz'15 joined the coalition. One member each from Civic Platform and the League of Polish Families (LPR) were also on the PSL list, despite those parties not belonging to the coalition.

In the 2019 parliamentary election, the PSL received 8.6 percent of the vote; an improvement compared to the 2015 parliamentary election. The coalition gained 30 seats in the Sejm: 20 from the PSL, six from Kukiz'15, one from the UED, and three independents. It also gained three senators: two from the PSL and one from the UED.

Coalition since the end of 2019 
Władysław Kosiniak-Kamysz of the PSL became coalition's candidate for the 2020 presidential election. He received 459,365 votes which was 2.4%, coming fifth among eleven candidates

On 26 November 2020, the General Council of PSL ended coalition with Kukiz'15, after 5 of 6 MPs of K'15 voted in favour of government's veto on European budget. Parliamentary club has its changed its title to Polish Coalition - PSL, UED, Conservatives.

5 politicians of Kukiz'15 with Paweł Kukiz has formed their own group in parliament, Agnieszka Ścigaj (who voted as PSL in case of veto) became independent MP. She joined PSL parliamentary group, but later she resigned from this political group and became unaffiliated MP.

In 2021 Polish Coalition started unofficial cooperation with Polish Affairs and Agreement, and decided to talk with Poland 2050 and more conservative local activists of Civic Platform about possibilities of creating centre to centre-right political faction in Poland.

Composition

2019 election

Ninth Sejm and 10th Senate

References

2019 establishments in Poland
Centrist parties in Europe
Christian democratic parties in Europe
Conservative parties in Poland
Direct democracy parties
Polish People's Party
Political parties established in 2019
Political party alliances in Poland
Pro-European political parties in Poland